Liu Yang or Yang Liu may refer to:

Emperor Ming of Han (28–75), personal name Liu Yang, emperor of the Han dynasty
Liu Yang (astronaut) (born 1978), first Chinese woman astronaut launched into space
Liu Yang (violinist), Chinese classical violinist
Yang Liu (dancer), member of the Royal New Zealand Ballet
Yang Xinhai, Chinese serial killer

Sportspeople
Liu Yang (high jumper) (born 1986), Chinese high jumper
Liu Yang (shot putter) (born 1986), Chinese shot putter
Liu Yang (wheelchair racer), (born 1990) Chinese wheelchair racer
Liu Yang (footballer, born 1991), Chinese football player
Liu Yang (footballer, born 1995), Chinese football player
Liu Yang (gymnast) (born 1994), Chinese gymnast
Liu Yang (judoka) (born 1988), Chinese judoka

See also
Liuyang, city in China
Yangliu township, Shandong
Yangliu township, Anhui